Ángel Franco (born 31 May 1958) is a Paraguayan professional golfer. His brother is golfer Carlos Franco.

Franco was born in Asunción and turned pro in 1974. He won the South American Tour Order of Merit in 1991. In 2007, he was second at the Carlos Franco Invitational, and won the same tournament in 2012 in a playoff against younger brother Ramon.

Currently, Franco is a member of European Seniors Tour, and the best finish on this tour was second place at the 2008 Jersey Seniors Classic, 2008 Russian Seniors Open and 2009 The De Vere Collection PGA Seniors Championship.

Professional wins (16)

Nike Tour wins (1)

Canadian Tour wins (1)

Tour de las Américas wins (1)
2000 TPG Movilnet Classic

TPG Tour wins (1)

Argentine wins (6)
1989 Jockey Club Rosario Open
1990 Los Lagartos Grand Prix, Praderas Grand Prix
1991 Rio Cuarto Open
1992 Center Open
1996 Norpatagonico Open

Other wins (6)

1990 Los Leones Open (Chile)
1991 Brazil Open, Prince of Wales Open (Chile)
1992 Quito Open (Ecuador)
1995 Marbella Open (Chile), Callaway Cup (Paraguay)

Team appearances
World Cup (representing Paraguay): 1985, 1991, 1993, 1994, 2001
Alfred Dunhill Cup (representing Paraguay): 1991, 1993, 1994, 1999

References

External links

Paraguayan male golfers
PGA Tour golfers
European Senior Tour golfers
Sportspeople from Asunción
1958 births
Living people